Francis E. McManus (September 21, 1875 – September 1, 1923), was a professional baseball player who played catcher from 1899 to 1904.

McManus was murdered in Syracuse, New York.

External links

1875 births
1923 deaths
Major League Baseball catchers
Brooklyn Superbas players
New York Highlanders players
Detroit Tigers players
Washington Senators (1891–1899) players
Male murder victims
People murdered in New York (state)
Sportspeople from Lawrence, Massachusetts
Brockton Shoemakers players
Augusta Kennebecs players
Portland (minor league baseball) players
Lewiston (minor league baseball) players
Fall River Indians players
Allentown Peanuts players
Hartford Cooperatives players
Newark Colts players
Kansas City Blues (baseball) players
Chicago White Stockings (minor league) players
Bangor (minor league baseball) players
Syracuse Stars (minor league baseball) players
Jersey City Skeeters players
Montreal Royals players
Buffalo Bisons (minor league) players
Seattle Siwashes players
Des Moines Boosters players
Burlington Pathfinders players
Keokuk Indians players
Baseball players from Massachusetts
19th-century baseball players